The 2019 Wirral Metropolitan Borough Council election took place on 2 May 2019 to elect members of Wirral Metropolitan Borough Council in England. This election was held on the same day as other local elections.

After the election, the composition of the council was:

Election results

Overall election result

Overall result compared with 2018.

Results by constituency

Birkenhead constituency

Birkenhead consists of the wards of Bidston and St James, Birkenhead and Tranmere, Claughton, Oxton, Prenton and Rock Ferry.

Wallasey constituency

Wallasey consists of the wards of Leasowe and Moreton East, Liscard, Moreton West and Saughall Massie, New Brighton, Seacombe and Wallasey.

Wirral South constituency

Wirral South consists of the wards of Bebington, Bromborough, Clatterbridge, Eastham, and Heswall.

Wirral West constituency

Wirral West consists of the wards of Greasby, Frankby and Irby, Hoylake and Meols, Pensby and Thingwall, Upton, and West Kirby and Thurstaston.

Changes in council composition

Prior to the election the composition of the council was:

After the election the composition of the council was:

Votes summary

Seats summary

Proportionality
The disproportionality of the 2019 election was 9.56 using the Gallagher Index.

Parties and candidates

Contesting political parties

At the last regular election (2018), The Conservatives, Greens and Labour all ran a full slate of candidates with the Liberal Democrats contesting all but one of the seats available with other parties only putting forward a handful of candidates between them.

Candidate selection
The Green Party selected Steve Hayes on 13 June 2018 to contest the seat of Birkenhead and Tranmere after Pat Cleary was re-elected in May.

On 17 September, incumbent Hoylake and Meols councillor of 20 years Gerry Ellis announced that he had been deselected by the Conservative Party. Ellis appealed against the deselection, claiming he had been "unlawfully" discriminated against because of his age. In December, Alison Wright was announced as the new Conservative candidate.

On 17 October, Phil Davies announced in a party email that he would stand down as Council Leader in May as well as not seeking re-election for his Birkenhead and Tranmere seat after serving on Wirral Council for over 27 years.

Labour's selection process began in October with the left targeting seats such as Liscard, Bidston and St James, Pensby and Thingwall, Rock Ferry and New Brighton. Both Ron Abbey (Leasowe and Moreton East) and Chris Meaden (Rock Ferry) were not selected. Bernie Mooney's re-selection for Liscard was questioned due to apparent irregularities in the selection process. Her candidacy was upheld by the regional party. However, on 27 February she was found to be in breach of Labour rules and subsequently removed from the panel of candidates by the Local Campaign Forum.

TUSC suspended their electoral activity in November so did not put forward any candidates.

In January, Meaden resigned the Labour whip and sought re-election as an independent.

Target seats
Labour targeted Eastham and Wallasey and hoped to hold on to Pensby and Thingwall and Oxton, the latter of which was held by the Liberal Democrats in the subsequent two elections.

The Conservatives' main target seat was Pensby and Thingwall, which they lost by just 23 votes in 2018.

The Liberal Democrats hoped to regain a third councillor in Oxton, and the Greens were looking to take a second in Birkenhead and Tranmere and to make headways in Prenton.

Campaign

On 26 March, Wirral Labour criticised the Conservatives for starting a Crowdfunder page for the election which had, so far, raised £20. This came despite itself having used crowdfunding with Tory leader Ian Lewis saying that they [Labour] needed to "get with the programme".

Outgoing Oxton councillor Paul Doughty was suspended from Labour in April due to campaigning for the Independent Group.

Representatives from all four parties in Council as well as the Independent Group appeared on Sunday Politics North West on 7 April talking about the issues facing the election campaign. Particular attention was given to the Green belt as well as the alleged rifts in the local Labour Party.

Leasowe and Moreton East Conservative candidate Debbie Caplin was criticised by Labour for comments she made to The Observer in 2016 in which she described her hometown of Moreton as "horrible". Tory Leader Ian Lewis defended her comments as being taken out of context stating that "Debbie, her family and her neighbours had been let down by years of Labour neglect".

Greenbelt leak controversy

On Monday 8 April, a report leaked by Pensby and Thingwall councillor Phil Brightmore claimed that 20 Green belt sites ranging from 2 to 1,705 houses had been "saved" from development. However, the following day a statement released by Wirral Council dismissed that any sites had been removed from the list of [Green belt] sites identified for potential release.

Further leaked documents suggested that Labour were deciding on potential sites based on political preference.

A full list of 21 "accepted" sites published on 23 April was described by Liberal Democrat planning spokesperson Stuart Kelly as a "shabby back-room carve up of green belt sites based on what was politically advantageous to Labour".

Policies

A 12 April article in the Wirral Globe put forward each party's priorities for the election.

Create 3,000 new jobs and apprenticeships through a regeneration programme
Invest £1 million in Liscard and New Ferry
Invest over £8 million on a highway improvements over the coming year
Replace every street light with energy efficient bulbs
Prioritise Brownfield sites for development

Push for a Local plan to protect the Green belt and direct investment toward Liscard and New Ferry
Invest in highway maintenance and road safety
Create jobs and apprenticeships
Cut business rates and car parking charges
Curb executive pay
Scrap Wirral View
Scrap the Leader and cabinet model in favour of a Committee system

"work together" to protect the Green belt as part of the creation of a Local plan
Scrap Wirral View
Curb executive pay
Cancel Hoylake Golf Resort
Support a People's Vote on Brexit

Ensure Local plan is "fit for purpose" by reducing the number of empty properties, maximizing Brownfield potential and protecting the Green belt
Engage with developers to optimise "green potential" of Wirral Waters
Declare a Climate Emergency and cut Wirral's Carbon footprint
Scrap Wirral View
Curb executive pay
Cancel Hoylake Golf Resort
Scrap the Leader and cabinet model in favour of a Committee system

Retiring councillors

Aftermath
Labour lost control of the Council losing two seats to the Greens and one to the Conservatives.

Labour councillors chose the new leader of their group Pat Hackett on 5 May. Hackett was elected Council leader on 14 May with 31 votes compared to 25 for Conservative leader Ian Lewis and 10 abstentions. The meeting also saw Labour lose their majority on every committee with chairs given to each opposition party.

Ward results
Results compared directly with the last local election in 2018.

Bebington

Bidston and St James

Birkenhead and Tranmere

Bromborough

Clatterbridge

Claughton

Eastham

Greasby, Frankby and Irby

Heswall

Hoylake and Meols

Leasowe and Moreton East

Liscard

Moreton West and Saughall Massie

New Brighton

Oxton

Pensby and Thingwall

Prenton

Rock Ferry

Seacombe

Upton

Wallasey

West Kirby and Thurstaston

Changes between 2019 and 2021

Notes
• italics denote the sitting councillor • bold denotes the winning candidate

References

2019 English local elections
2019
2010s in Merseyside
May 2019 events in the United Kingdom